Ron Henley may refer to:

Ron Henley (chess player) (born 1956), American chess grandmaster
Ron Henley (rapper), Filipino hip hop artist
 Ron Henley, keyboard player for the Liverpool Five